National Route 377 is a national highway of Japan connecting Naruto, Tokushima and Kan'onji, Kagawa in Japan, with a total length of 129.9 km (80.72 mi).

References

National highways in Japan
Roads in Kagawa Prefecture
Roads in Tokushima Prefecture